Adyge-Khablsky District is an administrative and municipal district (raion), one of the ten in the Karachay-Cherkess Republic, Russia. It is located in the north of the republic. Its administrative center is the rural locality (an aul) of Adyge-Khabl. As of the 2010 Census, the total population of the district was 16,186, with the population of Adyge-Khabl accounting for 24.4% of that number.

History
The district was established in 1957.  Nogaysky District was split out of it in 2007.

Administrative and municipal status
Within the framework of administrative divisions, Adyge-Khablsky District is one of the ten in the Karachay-Cherkess Republic and has administrative jurisdiction over all of its fifteen rural localities. As a municipal division, the district is incorporated as Adyge-Khablsky Municipal District. Its fifteen rural localities are incorporated into seven rural settlements within the municipal district. The aul of Adyge-Khabl serves as the administrative center of both the administrative and municipal district.

References

Notes

Sources

Districts of Karachay-Cherkessia